Gonzalo Sagi-Vela Fernández-Pérez (born 25 February 1950) is a Spanish basketball player. He competed in the men's tournament at the 1972 Summer Olympics.

References

1950 births
Living people
Basketball players at the 1972 Summer Olympics
CB Estudiantes players
Joventut Badalona players
Liga ACB players
Olympic basketball players of Spain
Spanish men's basketball players
Basketball players from Madrid
Small forwards